Damash Tehran Football Club, commonly known as Damash Tehran, is an Iranian football club based in capital Tehran, that competes in the Tehran Province League. The club was founded in 2008 and previously known as Parseh Tehran Football Club between 2011 and 2016.

Since the beginning of the 2011–12 season, Damash Tehran has played its home games at the Kargaran which has a capacity of 5,000.

History

Damash
Club was formed by Arya Investment Company and named Damash in 2008. The club participated in different competition since 2008–09 Iranian football season with the names of Damash Tehran and Damash Karaj.

Parseh Tehran
After its promotion to the Azadegan League in 2011, the club change its name to Parseh Tehran. The club was sold to Tehran-based businessman Kaveh Abedini in 2011. Kaveh Abedini is a businessman in Tehran. In the 2013–2014 Azadegan League season the club almost achieved a promotion to the Iran Pro League where they finished third, one point behind second placed Paykan.

Season-by-Season

The table below shows the achievements of the club in various competitions.

Club managers
Mehdi Pashazadeh (2012)
Alireza Emamifar (2012–2014)
Hamlet Mkhitaryan (2016)

See also
 Damash Gilan
 Gahar Zagros

References

Football clubs in Tehran
Association football clubs established in 2008
2008 establishments in Iran
Defunct football clubs in Iran